This is a list of film directors and television directors who were born in the United Kingdom, or lived and/or worked in the UK for a significant part of their career. Some Irish, American and European directors who have spent large portions of their career working in the UK are included on this list.

A
Babar Ahmed
Lewis Allen
Lindsay Anderson 
Michael Anderson
Michael Apted 
Andrea Arnold
Amma Asante
Anthony Asquith 
Richard Attenborough 
Paul WS Anderson
Jane Arden
Michael Armstrong
Richard Ayoade

B
Roy Ward Baker
 Leedham Bantock
Geoffrey Barkas
Sacha Bennett
Daniel Birt
Terry Bishop
Farren Blackburn
Keith Boak
John Boorman
John Boulting 
Danny Boyle 
Kenneth Branagh
Alan Bridges
Adrian Brunel
Paul Bryers
Clio Barnard
Jack Bond
Peter Brook

C
Danny Cannon
Ben Caron
Henry Cass
Peter Cattaneo
Charlie Chaplin
Alan Clarke
Noel Clarke
Jack Clayton
Alex Cox 
Charles Crichton
Richard Curtis
Alex Chandon
Elaine Constantine
Paddy Considine
Mark Cousins

D
Stephen Daldry
Desmond Davis
Terence Davies
Rowan Deacon
Basil Dean
Basil Dearden 
Clive Donner
Bill Douglas
Daniel Kobby Erskine

E
Sean Ellis
Cy Endfield
Rupert Everett

F
Terence Fisher
Bill Forsyth
Freddie Francis
Stephen Frears
Charles Frend
Bryan Forbes
Stephen Fry
Albert Finney

G
Lewis Gilbert
Terry Gilliam
John Gilling
Jonathan Glazer
Peter Greenaway
Val Guest
Paul Greengrass
Jack Gold

H
Robert Hamer
Guy Hamilton
John Harlow
Will Hay
Stuart Hazeldine
Mark Herman
David Hewlett (British born Canadian)
Alfred Hitchcock
Mike Hodges 
Seth Holt
Tom Hooper 
Peter Howitt
Hugh Hudson
Nicholas Hytner
Joanna Hogg
Andrew Haigh

I
Ian Emes
John Irvin
Armando Iannucci

J
Derek Jarman
Julian Jarrold
Garth Jennings
Vicky Jewson
Terry Jones
Duncan Jones

K
Patrick Keiller
Beeban Kidron
Anthony Kimmins
Bernard Knowles
Alexander Korda 
Zoltan Korda
Suri Krishnamma
Stanley Kubrick (U.S. Born)

L
Simon Langton
Frank Launder
David Lean 
Malcolm Le Grice
Mike Leigh 
 David Leland 
Richard Lester
Phyllida Lloyd
Ken Loach 
Adrian Lyne 
Jonathan Lynn
Kim Longinotto
Richard Loncraine
Charles Laughton

M
John Madden
James Marsh
Neil Marshall
Mary McGuckian
Steve McQueen
Shane Meadows
Sam Mendes
Anthony Minghella
Martin McDonagh
Norman McLaren
Gillies MacKinnon
Alexander Mackendrick
Carol Morley

N
Ronald Neame
Roy William Neill
Mike Newell
Christopher Nolan

O
George More O'Ferrall

P
Nick Park
Alan Parker
Sally Potter
Michael Powell 
Emeric Pressburger

R
Lynne Ramsay
Carol Reed
Michael Reeves
Karel Reisz
Lis Rhodes
Tony Richardson 
Guy Ritchie 
Bruce Robinson
Nicolas Roeg
 Bernard Rose
Ken Russell

S
Charles Saunders
Geoffrey Sax
John Schlesinger
Stefan Schwartz
Ridley Scott
Tony Scott
Francis Searle
Christopher Smith
Roger Spottiswoode
Rob Sorrenti
Paul L. Stein
Robert Stevenson

T
Amanda Tapping (British born Canadian)
Gerald Thomas
Ralph Thomas
J. Lee Thompson
Pete Travis

U
Peter Ustinov

V
Biju Viswanath
Matthew Vaughn

W
John Walsh
Peter Watkins
James Whale
Kanchi Wichmann
Georgina Willis
Michael Winner
Arthur B. Woods
Edgar Wright 
Joe Wright
Michael Winterbottom
Simon West
Ben Wheatley

Y
David Yates
Peter Yates
Terence Young

See also 
Cinema of the United Kingdom

References

External links 

Directors Guild of Great Britain website
British Academy of Film and Television Arts
Brit Movie Archive
100 Years of British Film
Lions of British Cinema --Focus on Directors
British Film Institute
Britmovie|Home of British Films

British
Film directors
List